The Botswana Music Awards Union (often simply the BOMU) are the Recording Industry of Botswana's music industry awards, established in 2011. The ceremony is held annually to celebrate the best or outstanding artists in Botswana. The nomination takes place and typically the winner announced according to jury's decision or according to the number of sent Sms since voting is done via mobile Sms.

The show has mostly been held at the  Gaborone International Convention Centre (GICC)  Gaborone, Botswana with the exception of six years, and broadcast live on national broadcaster, Botswana television. The ceremony features live performances as once-off collaborations by a selection of nominees. BOMU is usually sponsored by the MYSC Botswana with the annual grant program to do the project.

Bomu categories

Album genre categories 
 Best disco album
 Best Mosakaso album
 Best Polka/Folklore album
 Best Rnb album
 Best Afro pop album
 Best Jazz album
 Best traditional gospel album
 Best contemporary gospel album
 Best house music
 Best traditional music album
 Best Kwaito album

Non-genre categories 
 Honorary Legends award
a. Past
b. Present
 President award
 Best electronic media journalist
 Best Print Media journalist
 Most Dedicated artist

Other categories 
 Best Dvd
 Best Music producer
 Best Music video
 Single track
 Best collabo

External links 

 https://www.mmegi.bw/index.php?aid=75250&dir=2018/april/13

References

Botswana music
African music awards
Awards established in 2011